SELL Student Games is a multi-sport event that is open for all university and college students all over the world. The name of the games is according to the first letters of the hosting countries – Finland, Estonia, Latvia and Lithuania – in their respective languages (Finnish: Suomi, Estonian: Eesti, Latvian: Latvija, Lithuanian: Lietuva).
The principles of the games are that everyone can participate and therefore the event combines top sports and joyful student event. Nowadays the games gather around 1800–2000 students.

Events 

The main disciplines of the games are athletics, swimming, orienteering, judo and chess as individual events. Basketball, volleyball (mini) football and floorball / unihockey are as team events. Also tennis, badminton, table tennis, wrestling, ultimate, aesthetic group gymnastics and ice-hockey has appeared in the games.

History 

In 1923 student organizations of Finland, Estonia, Latvia and Lithuania established an extensive co-operation agreement, which resulted in first regional student competition for the university students of the respective countries in Tartu, Estonia. The competitions lasted until 1940 when the last winter games were held before the ties between Baltic States were severed by World War II. During this period there were organized separately summer games, winter games and chess tournaments. 
After Baltic States became independent again the tradition of competition was restored in a meeting held 21.4. 1997, and the SELL Games were organized in 1998 in Tartu. The competition has been open to all university students around the world since then.

Hosts

SELL summer games

SELL winter games

SELL chess tournaments

Results

2022

Records
Athletics has been one of the sports held at the Games since the inaugural edition.

Men's athletics

Women's athletics

See also
 South American University Games
 European Universities Games
 ASEAN University Games
 All-Africa University Games
 Baltic Sea Games

References

Bell, Daniel (2003). Encyclopedia of International Games (Pg. 337-8). McFarland and Company, Inc. Publishers, Jefferson, North Carolina. .

External links 

 
Student sports competitions
Multi-sport events
International sports competitions hosted by Estonia
International sports competitions hosted by Latvia
International sports competitions hosted by Lithuania
International sports competitions hosted by Finland
European international sports competitions
Multi-sport events in Estonia
Multi-sport events in Finland
Multi-sport events in Lithuania
Multi-sport events in Latvia
Multi-sport events in Europe